Turke may refer to:

 , a village in the municipality of Delnice, Croatia
 András István Türke, Hungarian academic
 Gerhard Türke, German army officer, recipient of the Knight's Cross of the Iron Cross
 John Turke, 14th-century chancellor of the University of Oxford

See also 

 
 Turkiye (disambiguation)
 Turkey (disambiguation)
 Turky (disambiguation)
 Turki (disambiguation)
 Turk (disambiguation)